Michael O'Hearn (born January 26, 1969) is an American bodybuilder, personal trainer, actor, and model. He has been featured on over 400 magazine covers, was Fitness Model of the Year seven times, and is a four-time Mr. Natural Universe title holder. He appeared as the gladiator "Titan" on the 2008 revival of American Gladiators. O'Hearn is the only individual to be a Gladiator on both the original (1989–1996) (as Thor) and the 2008 series. He is the founder of Power Bodybuilding, a training program that focuses on developing both strength and hypertrophy, along with aesthetics.

Early life 
O'Hearn was born in Kirkland, Washington, on January 26, 1969. He has eight siblings.

Career

Acting 
O'Hearn had a minor supporting role in the 1992 film Death Becomes Her, and later starred as Clark Kent/Superman in the 2004 Sandy Collora fan film World's Finest. He appeared as the gladiator Titan on the 2008 revival of American Gladiators, making him the only individual to appear on both the original series (in which he played the gladiator Thor) and the revival series. He also played Michael O'Dell on the American Gladiators-like show Battle Dome from 1999 to 2001. In 2008, he made a guest appearance on the NBC soap opera Days of Our Lives as a bartender, and reprised his role of Titan on an episode of NBC's Celebrity Family Feud with fellow gladiators Jet, Venom, and Wolf. In February 2009, he made a guest appearance as a cage fighter in episode 14 of NBC's Knight Rider revival. In 2011, he appeared in season 7 of It's Always Sunny in Philadelphia, playing Mac's "avatar" in the episode "How Mac Got Fat". That same year, he played a bodybuilder in the Workaholics episode "Muscle I'd Like to Flex". In 2012, O'Hearn self-produced and starred in the 7-episode action sci-fi thriller, Alter Ego.

References

External links
Official website

American bodybuilders
Male models from Washington (state)
American male actors
Living people
1969 births
Sportspeople from Kirkland, Washington